Løken is a village in the municipality of Aurskog-Høland, Norway. Its population is 1,539.

References

Villages in Akershus
Aurskog-Høland